Gourimanohari or Gaurimanohari is a rāgam in Carnatic music (musical scale of South Indian classical music). It is the 23rd Melakarta rāgam in the 72 melakarta rāgam system of Carnatic music.

The Western equivalent is the jazz minor scale.

The Hindustani music equivalent to this rāgam is Raag Patdeep.

Structure and Lakshana 

It is the 5th rāgam in the 4th chakra Veda. The mnemonic name is Veda-Ma. The mnemonic phrase is sa ri gi ma pa dhi nu. Its  structure (ascending and descending scale) is as follows (see swaras in Carnatic music for details on below notation and terms):
: 
: 

The notes used in this scale are shadjam, chatushruti rishabham, sadharana gandharam, shuddha madhyamam, panchamam, chatushruti daivatam and kakali nishadham. It is a sampurna rāgam – a rāgam that has all seven swaras (notes). It is the shuddha madhyamam equivalent of Dharmavati, which is the 59th melakarta.

Janya rāgams 
It has a few minor janya rāgams (derived scales) associated with it. See List of janya rāgams to look up all rāgams associated with it.

Popular compositions 
The following are a few popular compositions in this rāgam.
Guruleka etuvanti by Thyagaraja
Varalakshmi Namostute by Mysore Vasudevacharya
Sarasa sama mridu pada by Swati Tirunal
Brova Samayamide Ramayya by Karur Devudu Iyer
Gangadhara Shiva by Sri Ganapathy Sachchidananda Swamiji
Gauri Manohara by Papanasam Sivan

‘Shades of Blue: A Musical Tribute to Venmurasu’ sung by Kamal Haasan, Sriram Parthasarathy, Saindhavi composed by Rajan Somasundaram is considered to be the definition of this ragam as it explores various shades of expressions possible in Gaurimanohari using vocals, Sitar, Sarangi, Flute, singing bowls and various string instruments.

Film Songs

Language:Tamil

Language:Kannada

Albums

Tamil

Related rāgams 
This section covers the theoretical and scientific aspect of this rāgam.

Gourimanohari's notes when shifted using Graha bhedam, yields 3 other major melakarta rāgams, namely, Vachaspati, Natakapriya and Charukesi. Graha bhedam is the step taken in keeping the relative note frequencies same, while shifting the shadjam to the next note in the rāgam. For further details and an illustration see Graha bhedam on Vachaspati.

Notes

References 

Melakarta ragas